Peter David John CBE is a British academic and educator, currently the Vice Chancellor of the University of West London. He previously served as the Pro-Vice Chancellor and the Deputy Vice Chancellor of the University of Plymouth.

Academic career 
He began his academic career in University of Reading and University of Bristol holding various positions and was awarded Guardian's most Inspiring University Leader of the year. He led the University of West London in inter alia, the Times Higher Outstanding Senior Leadership Team in 2017. He was executive and founding member of Association of Modern Universities and head of Access HE, founding member of Learning Analytics Board London and member of the Local Strategic Partnership Board for Ealing.

After working in academic sectors for more than 30 years, he later joined the West London University in 2007. He holds a bachelor's degree from University of Wales, Bristol University and Jesus College but obtained his PhD from Bristol University in history and research. He also holds an honorary doctorate at the University of Plymouth. He is the patron of Ealing Music and Film Festival and a member of the Lord's Taverners. After successful publication of seven books during his career, he was the recipient of more than £3 million in funding of research.

In the Queen's 2020 New Year honours, he was made Commander of the Order of the British Empire (CBE) for his services in higher education.

Notes 

British writers
Alumni of the University of Bristol
Alumni of the University of Wales
Academics of University College London
Academics of the University of West London
Academics of the University of Plymouth
Academics of the University of Reading
Academics of the University of Bristol
Academics of the University of Manchester
Academics of the University of Southampton
Academics of Keele University
Alumni of Jesus College, Oxford
Commanders of the Order of the British Empire
Year of birth missing (living people)
Place of birth missing (living people)
Living people